Louis of Naples may refer to:
Saint Louis of Toulouse (1274–1297), son of king Charles II of Naples
Louis I of Naples (r. 1348–1362), also known as Louis of Taranto 
Louis I of Anjou (d. 1384), titular king (or anti-king) of Naples (coronation by Antipope Clement VII in 1382)
Louis II of Anjou (1377–1417), king of Naples as Louis II (r. 1389–1399)
Louis III of Anjou (d. 1434), titular king of Naples as Louis III (r. 1417–1426)

See also
List of monarchs of Naples
List of monarchs of Sicily
Louis of Sicily